Zhelominino is a rural locality (a village) in Yurovskoye Rural Settlement, Gryazovetsky District, Vologda Oblast, Russia. The population was 4 as of 2002.

Geography 
Zhelominino is located 15 km southwest of Gryazovets (the district's administrative centre) by road. Starovo is the nearest rural locality.

References 

Rural localities in Gryazovetsky District